The Wasa are Akan people who live predominantly in Ghana.

Territory 

The prominent towns in Wasa are: Samreaboi, Asankrangwa, Manso-Amenfi, Wasa Akropong, Bawdie, Bogoso, Prestea, Tarkwa, Daboase, Nsuta and Mpohor.

Wasa is the largest tribe in Western Region in terms of land and population.

References

Akan
Ethnic groups in Ivory Coast